Ben Mason may refer to:
Ben Mason (American football) (born 1999), NFL fullback
Ben Mason (golfer) (born 1977), English professional golfer
Ben Mason, see List of Falling Skies characters
Ben Mason, musician in The Smallgoods

See also
Benjamin Mason (disambiguation)